Daren Stone (born August 21, 1985 in Lockport, New York) is a former American football Linebacker. He had a stint with the Calgary Stampeders in 2011. Stone is a former American football safety. He was drafted by the Atlanta Falcons in the sixth round of the 2007 NFL Draft. He played college football at Maine.

Stone has also played for the Dallas Cowboys and Baltimore Ravens.

Early years
Stone attended Lockport High School in Lockport, New York and was a student and a letterman in football, basketball, and track. In football, as a senior, he was named the team's Defensive Player of the Year, was a first-team All-League selection, and was a second-team All-Western New York selection. In basketball, he was a second-team All-League selection. In track, he was a first-team All-Western New York selection. Daren Stone graduated from Lockport Senior High School in 2003.

Professional career

Atlanta Falcons
As a rookie in 2007, Stone made the Atlanta Falcons' active roster. In his debut against the Buffalo Bills, he sacked quarterback J. P. Losman. Stone was released by the Falcons for Drunk Driving Arrest on August 30, 2008 during final cuts.

Dallas Cowboys
Stone was signed by the Dallas Cowboys on October 21, 2008 after safety Roy Williams was placed on injured reserve. Stone was released a week later on October 28 when the team re-signed cornerback Quincy Butler.

Baltimore Ravens
Stone was signed by the Baltimore Ravens on November 5, 2008 after the team waived cornerback Anwar Phillips. He contributed on special teams for the remainder of the season. In the 2009 AFC Championship Game versus the Pittsburgh Steelers, Stone committed an unnecessary roughness penalty that cost the Ravens field position (moving them from near midfield to their own 14) at a critical time in the game.  Stone had suffered a concussion on the opening kickoff of the game.

An exclusive-rights free agent in the 2009 offseason, Stone was not tendered a contract offer by the Ravens.

Calgary Stampeders
On May 27, 2011, the Calgary Stampeders signed Stone as a free agent.

Saskatchewan Roughriders
On May 18, 2012, the Saskatchewan Roughriders signed Stone.

References

External links
Just Sports Stats
Maine Black Bears bio

1985 births
Living people
People from Lockport, New York
American football safeties
Maine Black Bears football players
Atlanta Falcons players
Dallas Cowboys players
Baltimore Ravens players
Calgary Stampeders players
Saskatchewan Roughriders players